Nieuw Verlaat is a station on Line B of the Rotterdam Metro and is situated in the Zevenkamp neighbourhood of Rotterdam.

Rotterdam Metro stations